Lawless Roads (French: Chemins sans loi) is a 1947 French drama film directed by Guillaume Radot and starring Ginette Leclerc, Jean Murat and Marguerite Moreno. It was shot at the Billancourt Studios in Paris. The film's sets were designed by the art director Marcel Magniez.

Synopsis
Inès, a gypsy has a relationship with a landowner but he abandons her. Pregnant she falls in with a gang of horse thieves, and brings up her daughter Dolorès amongst them.

Cast
 Ginette Leclerc as Inès  
 Jean Murat as Florent Lemercier  
 Marguerite Moreno as Hélène  
 Madeleine Rousset as Dolorès  
 José Conrad as L'Araignée  
 Michel Barbey as Petit-Plon  
 Jean Clarieux as Dem  
 Alfred Baillou as Julien, le bossu 
 Grégoire Gromoff as La Douceur 
 Albert Dagnant 
 Claudine Dupuis 
 Jacqueline François 
 Paul Oettly

References

Bibliography 
 Rège, Philippe. Encyclopedia of French Film Directors, Volume 1. Scarecrow Press, 2009.

External links 
 

1947 films
French drama films
1947 drama films
1940s French-language films
Films directed by Guillaume Radot
Fictional representations of Romani people
French black-and-white films
1940s French films
Films shot at Billancourt Studios